The South West Heritage Trust is a charity which was formed in 2014. It is involved in the preservation and management of the heritage of Somerset and Devon.

In 2014 the trust took over the management of local archives for the Devon Record Offices and Somerset Archives and Local Studies.

The trust is also responsible for three local museums: The Rural Life Museum in Glastonbury, the Museum of Somerset in Taunton and The Brick and Tile Museum in Bridgwater. Workshops and resources are also available to local schools.

Courses are provided which include those on searching family history and reading old handwriting. Archaeological advice on planning applications are provided for local county and district councils.

References

External links
 South West Heritage Trust

Archives in Somerset
History of Somerset
County record offices in England
Education in Somerset
History of Devon
Organisations based in Taunton
Organizations established in 2014
Education in Devon
Charities based in Somerset
Charities based in Devon